Cruz María Salmerón Acosta (Born January 3, 1892, in Manicuare, Venezuela – 30 July 1929 in Manicuare) was a Venezuelan poet. His sonnets were influenced by the movement of modernismo.

Received his early education in the home of Petra and Carlota González, neighbors of Manicuare. Then moved to Cumaná entering in the school of Pedro Luis Cedeño, and attends high school in the Federal Lyceum, in the same city. In 1910 travels to Caracas and begins to study political science in the Central University of Venezuela. By 1911 wrote his first sonnet Cielo y Mar (Sky and Sea) dedicated to his friend, the poet José Antonio Ramos Sucre. In addition, contributes in publications such as: Satiricón, La U, Claros del Alba, Élite, Renacimiento, El Universal, El Nuevo Diario and Broche de Oro.

Two years later is diagnosed with leprosy. Doctors advise him to return to Manicuare to avoid a medical isolation. Salmerón continued in his studies despite the warning. But in 1913, returns to his hometown after the closing of the university by the government of Juan Vicente Gómez.

After his return, his sister Encarnación dies, and his brother Antoñico was killed by the civil chief of the town. Because of this, Salmerón decides to confront the authority and was jailed for a year in Cumaná. Then comes back to Manicuare, refuging in a small house built especially for him. There he would spend his last fifteen years.

During the month of July, 1929, Manicuare suffers a severe drought. After his death on 30 July, in the town rains again. This coincidence has become part of the heritage of the region, popularly expressed in songs like Canción Cumanesa, of singer-songwriter Alí Primera.

A compilation of his work was published in 1952 entitled as Fuente de Amargura (Bitterness Fountain). In 1983, film director Jacobo Penzo made a movie based on his life: La Casa de Agua (The House of Water). In his honor was named the municipality where is Manicuare.

References

  Cruz Salmerón Acosta - Universidad de Oriente
  Personajes de las letras: Cruz Salmerón Acosta - Orienteweb.com
  Historia de Cruz Salmerón Acosta... El poeta de Manicuare - Sucre Turístico
  Life and work of Salmerón Acosta - Letralia
  Cruz María Salmerón Acosta (1892-1929) - El poder de la palabra

External links 
  Sonnet «Azul» (Blue) - YouTube
  Cruz Salmerón Acosta: la historia que canta mi pueblo - Youtube

1892 births
1929 deaths
People from Sucre (state)
Venezuelan male poets
Central University of Venezuela alumni
Deaths from leprosy
20th-century Venezuelan poets
20th-century male writers